Edgar Donald Mountain (2 April 1901 – 30 April 1985) was a British middle-distance runner. He competed in the 800 m event at the 1920 and 1924 Summer Olympics and finished fourth in 1920, setting a British junior record.

After the 1924 Olympics Mountain settled in South Africa and later became a specialist in South African geological formations and professor at Rhodes University. He discovered several minerals, and one them, mountainite, bears his name.

Mountain was educated at Sutton Valence School.

References

1901 births
1985 deaths
Sportspeople from London
British male middle-distance runners
Olympic athletes of Great Britain
Athletes (track and field) at the 1920 Summer Olympics
Athletes (track and field) at the 1924 Summer Olympics
English emigrants to South Africa
People educated at Sutton Valence School